The 1967 UTEP Miners football team was an American football team that represented the University of Texas at El Paso as an independent during the 1967 NCAA University Division football season.  This was the first season for the program, since changing its name from Texas Western to UTEP. In its third season under head coach Bobby Dobbs, the team compiled a 7–2–1 record, defeated Ole Miss in the 1967 Sun Bowl, and outscored all opponents by a total of 337 to 145.

Schedule

References

UTEP
UTEP Miners football seasons
UTEP Miners football